Zhao was one of the seven major states during the Warring States period of ancient China. It was created from the three-way Partition of Jin, together with Han and Wei, in the 5th century BC. Zhao gained significant strength from the military reforms initiated during King Wuling's reign, but suffered a crushing defeat at the hands of Qin at the Battle of Changping. Its territory included areas now in modern Inner Mongolia, Hebei, Shanxi and Shaanxi provinces.  It bordered the states of Qin, Wei and Yan and various nomadic peoples, including the Hu and Xiongnu. Its capital was Handan, in modern Hebei Province.

Zhao was home to administrative philosopher Shen Dao, sophist Gongsun Long and the Confucian Xun Kuang.

Origins and ascendancy 
The Zhao clan within Jin had accumulated power for centuries, including annexing the Baidi state of Dai for themselves during the mid-5th centuryBC.

At the end of the Spring and Autumn Period, Jin was divided up between three powerful ministers; Xiangzi, the Zhao family patriarch being one of them. In 403 BC, the king of Zhou formally recognized the existence of the State of Zhao along with two other States, Han and Wei, marking the start of the Warring States Period.

At the onset of the Warring States period, Zhao was one of the weaker states. Despite its extensive territory, its northern border was frequently subject to harassment by the Eastern Hu, Forest Hu, Loufan, Xiongnu and other northern nomadic peoples. At the same time, Zhao was surrounded by strong states and lacked the military strength of Wei or the prosperity of Qi. Zhao became a pawn in the struggle between the states of Wei and Qi, and this struggle came to a climax in 354 BC when Wei invaded Zhao, and Zhao had to seek aid from Qi. The resulting Battle of Guiling was a major victory for Qi, and it consequently lessened the threat to Zhao's southern border.

Zhao remained relatively weak until the military reforms of King Wuling of Zhao (325-299 BC). The soldiers of Zhao were ordered to dress like their Hu neighbours and to replace war chariots with cavalry archers. This reform proved to be a brilliant strategy. With the advanced technology of the Chinese states and nomadic tactics, the cavalry of Zhao became a powerful force. The result was that the newly strengthened Zhao was evenly matched against its greatest enemy, the state of Qi.

Zhao demonstrated its enhanced military prowess by conquering the State of Zhongshan in 295 BC after a prolonged war, and annexing territory from its neighbouring states of Wei, Yan, and Qin. During this time, the cavalry of Zhao also occasionally intruded into the state of Qi in campaigns against the state of Chu.

Several brilliant military commanders of the period appeared concurrently, including Lian Po, Zhao She and Li Mu. Lian Po proved instrumental in defending Zhao against the Qin. Zhao She was most active in the east; leading the invasion of the Yan state. Li Mu defended Zhao from the Xiongnu in the Zhao–Xiongnu War and later from Qin.

Fall of Zhao

By the end of the Warring States Period, Zhao was the only state strong enough to oppose the powerful Qin state. An alliance with Wei against Qin commenced in 287 BC but ended in defeat at Huayang in 273 BC. The struggle then culminated in the bloodiest battle of the whole period, the Battle of Changping in 260 BC. The troops of Zhao were completely defeated by Qin. Although the forces of Wei and Chu saved Handan from a follow-up siege by the victorious Qin, Zhao would never recover from the enormous loss of men in the battle.

In 229 BC, invasions led by the Qin general Wang Jian were opposed by Li Mu and his subordinate officer Sima Shang until 228 BC. Li Mu was one of the best generals of the Warring States era, and although he was unable to defeat Wang Jian (also one of the best generals of the period), Wang Jian was unable to make headway either. The invasion developed into a stalemate. Realizing that he had to get rid of Li Mu to conquer Zhao, the emperor of Qin, Qin Shihuang, attempted to sow discord among the Zhao leadership. Zhao King Youmiu fell for the scheme: acting on faulty advice from disloyal court officials and Qin infiltrators, he ordered the execution of Li Mu and relieved Sima Shang from his duties. Li Mu's replacement, Zhao Cong, was promptly defeated by Wang Jian. Qin captured King Youmiu and conquered Zhao in 228 BC. Prince Jia, the half-brother of King Qian, was proclaimed King Jia at Dai and led the last Zhao forces against the Qin. The regime lasted until 222 BC, when the Qin army captured him and defeated his forces at Dai.

A rebel named Wu Chen, following Chen Sheng and Wu Guang's suits at Chu, proclaimed himself King of Zhao. Wu was later killed by his subordinate Li Liang. Zhang Er and Chen Yu, former officials of Zhao, created a Zhao royal, Zhao Xie, as king of Zhao. In 206 BC, the rebel lord of Chu, Xiang Yu, defeated the Qin dynasty and created himself and other seventeen lords as kings, making Zhao Xie the king of Dai. Chen Yu helped Zhao Xie taking back the land of Zhao from Zhang Er, so Zhao Xie created Chen Yu prince of Dai. In 205 BC, Chen Yu's subordinate at Dai, Xia Yue, was defeated by Liu Bang's generals Han Xin and Zhang Er. Chen Yu was defeated by Han Xin in 204 BC and later, Zhao Xie was killed by Han forces. Liu Bang gifted the state of Zhao to Zhang Er.

In 154 BC, an unrelated Zhao, headed by Liu Sui, the Prince of Zhao kingdom, participated in the unsuccessful Rebellion of the Seven States against the newly installed second emperor of the Han dynasty.

Culture and society
 
Before the state of Qin unified China in 221 BC, each region had their own unique customs and culture, although they were all dominated by an upper class that shared a largely common culture. In the Yu Gong (Tribute of Yu), a section of the Book of Documents which was most likely composed in the 4th century BC, the author describes a China that is divided into nine regions, each with its own distinctive peoples and products. The core theme of this section is that these nine regions are unified into one state by the travels of the eponymous sage, Yu the Great and by sending each region's unique goods to the capital as tribute. Other texts also discussed these regional variations in culture and physical environments.

One of these texts was Wuzi (The Book of Master Wu) which was a Warring States military treatise written in response to a query by Marquis Wu of Wei on how to cope with the other states. Wu Qi, the author of the work, declared that the government and nature of the people were linked to the physical environment and territory they live in.

Of Zhao, he said:

List of Zhao rulers

Before the partition of Jin 
 Chengzi of Zhao
 Xuanzi of Zhao
 Zhuangzi of Zhao
 Wenzi of Zhao
 Jingzi of Zhao
 Jianzi of Zhao
 Xiangzi of Zhao
 Huanzi of Zhao

After the partition of Jin 
 Marquess Xian, personal name Huan, ruled 424 BC–409 BC
 Marquess Lie, personal name Ji, son of previous, ruled 409 BC–387 BC, noted for several reforms
 Marquess Jing, personal name Zhang, son of previous, ruled 387 BC–375 BC
 Marquess Cheng, personal name Zhong, son of previous, ruled 375 BC–350 BC
 Marquess Su, personal name Yu, son of previous, ruled 350 BC–326 BC
 King Wuling, personal name Yong, son of previous, ruled 326 BC–Spring 299 BC
 King Huiwen, personal name He, son of previous, ruled Spring 299 BC–266 BC
 King Xiaocheng, personal name Dan, son of previous, ruled 266 BC–245 BC
 King Daoxiang, personal name Yan, son of previous, ruled 245 BC–236 BC
 King Youmiu, personal name Qian, son of previous, ruled 236 BC–228 BC
 King Jia of Dai, personal name Jia, half-brother of previous, ruled 228 BC–222 BC
 Xie, King of Zhao, ruled 209 BC–205 BC. Also known as Zhao Xie. A reinstalled king of Zhao by rioting peasants during the reign of Qin Er Shi. Defeated and Killed by Liu Bang.

Zhao in astronomy
There are two opinions about the representing star of Zhao in Chinese astronomy. The opinions are :
 Zhao is represented with the star Lambda Herculis in asterism Left Wall, Heavenly Market enclosure ., and also represented with two stars 26 Capricorni and 27 Capricorni in asterism Twelve States, Girl mansion. (see Chinese constellation).
 Zhao is represented with the star Lambda Herculis, and also represented with star "m Capricorni".

See also
Zhao (Han dynasty kingdom)
Han Zhao
Later Zhao

References

 
Ancient Chinese states
403 BC
Jin (Chinese state)
History of Hebei
History of Shanxi
222 BC
States and territories disestablished in the 3rd century BC
3rd-century BC disestablishments in China
5th-century BC establishments in China
Former kingdoms